The distribution of wealth is a comparison of the wealth of various members or groups in a society. It shows one aspect of economic inequality or economic heterogeneity.

The distribution of wealth differs from the income distribution in that it looks at the economic distribution of ownership of the assets in a society, rather than the current income of members of that society. According to the International Association for Research in Income and Wealth, "the world distribution of wealth is much more unequal than that of income."

For rankings regarding wealth, see list of countries by wealth equality or list of countries by wealth per adult.

Definition of wealth

Wealth of an individual is defined as net worth, expressed as: wealth = assets − liabilities

A broader definition of wealth, which is rarely used in the measurement of wealth inequality, also includes human capital. For example, the United Nations definition of inclusive wealth is a monetary measure which includes the sum of natural, human and physical assets.

The relation between wealth, income, and expenses is: change of wealth = saving = income − consumption (expenses). If an individual has a large income but also large expenses, the net effect of that income on her or his wealth could be small or even negative.

Conceptual framework 

There are many ways in which the distribution of wealth can be analyzed. One common-used example is to compare the amount of the wealth of individual at say 99 percentile relative to the wealth of the median (or 50th) percentile. This is P99/P50, which is one of the potential Kuznets ratios. Another common measure is the ratio of total amount of wealth in the hand of top say 1% of the wealth distribution over the total wealth in the economy. In many societies, the richest ten percent control more than half of the total wealth.

The Pareto Distribution has often been used to mathematically quantify the distribution of wealth at the right tail (the wealth of the very rich); stating that the upper 20% owns 80%, the upper 4% owns 64%, the upper 0.8% owns 51.2%, etc.  In fact, the tail of wealth distributions, similar to that of income distribution, behaves like a Pareto distribution but with a thicker tail.  

Wealth over people (WOP) curves are a visually compelling way to show the distribution of wealth in a nation. WOP curves are modified distribution of wealth curves. The vertical and horizontal scales each show percentages from zero to one hundred. We imagine all the households in a nation being sorted from richest to poorest. They are then shrunk down and lined up (richest at the left) along the horizontal scale. For any particular household, its point on the curve represents how their wealth compares (as a proportion) to the average wealth of the richest percentile. For any nation, the average wealth of the richest 1/100 of households is the topmost point on the curve (people, 1%; wealth, 100%) or (p=1, w=100) or (1, 100). In the real world two points on the WOP curve are always known before any statistics are gathered. These are the topmost point (1, 100) by definition, and the rightmost point (poorest people, lowest wealth) or (p=100, w=0) or (100, 0). This unfortunate rightmost point is given because there are always at least one percent of households (incarcerated, long term illness, etc.) with no wealth at all. Given that the topmost and rightmost points are fixed ... our interest lies in the form of the WOP curve between them. There are two extreme possible forms of the curve. The first is the "perfect communist" WOP. It is a straight line from the leftmost (maximum wealth) point horizontally across the people scale to p=99. Then it drops vertically to wealth = 0 at (p=100, w=0).

The other extreme is the "perfect tyranny" form. It starts on the left at the Tyrant's maximum wealth of 100%. It then immediately drops to zero at p=2, and continues at zero horizontally across the rest of the people. That is, the tyrant and his friends (the top percentile) own all the nation's wealth. All other citizens are serfs or slaves. An obvious intermediate form is a straight line connecting the left/top point to the right/bottom point. In such a "Diagonal" society a household in the richest percentile would have just twice the wealth of a family in the median (50th) percentile. Such a society is compelling to many (especially the poor). In fact it is a comparison to a diagonal society that is the basis for the Gini values used as a measure of the disequity in a particular economy. These Gini values (40.8 in 2007) show the United States to be the third most dis-equitable economy of all the developed nations (behind Denmark and Switzerland).

More sophisticated models have also been proposed.

Theoretical approaches 
To model aspects of the distribution and holdings of wealth, there have been many different types of theories used. Before the 1960s, the data regarding this was collected mostly from wealth tax and estate tax records, with further proof gathered from small unrepresentative examinations and a variety of other sources. The results from these sources tended to show that the distribution of wealth was very unequal, and that material inheritance had a big role in the matter of wealth differences and in the transmission of the status of wealth from generation to generation. There was also reason to believe that the inequality in wealth was shrinking over time, and also the distribution’s shape demonstrated particular statistical regularities that could not have been caused by coincidence. Thus, early theoretical work on the distribution of wealth wanted to explain the statistical regularities, and also comprehend the relationship of basic forces which could be an explanation for the concentration of wealth to be high and the trend of declining over time.

More lately, the research about wealth distribution has moved away from the worry with overall distributional characteristics, and in its place focuses more on the grounds of individual differences in the holdings of wealth. This change was caused partly because the importance of saving for retirement increased, and it is reflected in the vital role now assigned to the model of lifecycle savings developed by Modigliani and Brumberg (1954), and Ando and Modigliani (1963). Another important progress has been the increase in availability and finesse in sets of micro-data, which offer not just estimations of individuals’ asset holdings and savings but also a variety of other household and personal characteristics that can assist in explain the differences in wealth.

Wealth inequality 
Wealth inequality refers to uneven distribution of wealth among individuals and entities.

Global inequality statistics 
A study by the World Institute for Development Economics Research at United Nations University reports that the richest 1% of adults alone owned 40% of global assets in the year 2000, and that the richest 10% of adults accounted for 85% of the world total. The bottom half of the world adult population owned 1% of global wealth. A 2006 study found that the richest 2% own more than half of global household assets. The Pareto Distribution gives 52.8% owned by the upper 1%.

According to the OECD in 2012 the top 0.6% of world population (consisting of adults with more than US$1 million in assets) or the 42 million richest people in the world held 39.3% of world wealth. The next 4.4% (311 million people) held 32.3% of world wealth. The bottom 95% held 28.4% of world wealth. The large gaps of the report get by the Gini index to 0.893, and are larger than gaps in global income inequality, measured in 2009 at 0.38. For example, in 2012 the bottom 60% of the world population held the same wealth in 2012 as the people on Forbes' Richest list consisting of 1,226 richest billionaires of the world.  

A 2021 Oxfam report found that collectively, the 10 richest men in the world owned more than the combined wealth of the bottom 3.1 billion people, almost half of the entire world population. Their combined wealth doubled during the pandemic.

‘Global wealth Report 2021’, published by Credit Suisse, shows a substantial worldwide increase in wealth inequality during 2020. According to Credit Suisse, wealth distribution pyramid in 2020 shows that the richest group of adult population (1.1%) owns 45.8% of the total wealth. When compared to the 2013 wealth distribution pyramid, an overall increase of 4.8% can be seen. The bottom half of the world’s total adult population, the bottom quartile in the pyramid, owns only 1.3% of the total wealth. Again, when compared to the 2013 wealth distribution pyramid, a decrease of 1.7% can be observed. In conclusion, this comparison shows a substantial worldwide increase in wealth inequality over these years.

One of the main explanations for the ongoing increase of wealth inequality are the repercussions of the COVID-19 pandemic. Credit Suisse claims that the economic impact of the pandemic on employment and incomes in 2020 are likely to have a negative effect for the lowest groups of wealth holders, forcing them to spend more from their savings or incur higher debt. On the other hand, top wealth groups appeared to be relatively unaffected in this negative way. Moreover, they seemed to benefit from the impact of lower interest rates on share and house prices.

According to the ‘Global Wealth Report 2021’ published by Credit Suisse, there are 56 million millionaires in the world in 2020, increasing by 5.2 million from a year earlier. The biggest number of dollar millionaires is reported in the USA, with 22 million millionaires (approximately 39% of the world total). This is far ahead of China, holding second place, with 9.4% of all global millionaires. The third place is currently being held by Japan, with 6.6% of all global millionaires.

Real estate
While sizeable numbers of households own no land, few have no income.  For example, the top 10% of land owners (all corporations) in Baltimore, Maryland own 58% of the taxable land value.  The bottom 10% of those who own any land own less than 1% of the total land value. This form of analysis as well as Gini coefficient analysis has been used to support land value taxation.

Wealth distribution pyramid 

In 2013, Credit Suisse prepared a wealth pyramid infographic (shown right). Personal assets were calculated in net worth, meaning wealth would be negated by having any mortgages. It has a large base of low wealth holders, alongside upper tiers occupied by progressively fewer people. In 2013 Credit-suisse estimate that 3.2 billion individuals – more than two thirds of adults in the world – have wealth below US$10,000. A further one billion (adult population) fall within the 10,000 – US$100,000 range. While the average wealth holding is modest in the base and middle segments of the pyramid, their total wealth amounts to US$40 trillion, underlining the potential for novel consumer products and innovative financial services targeted
at this often neglected segment.

The pyramid shows that:
 half of the world's net wealth belongs to the top 1%,
 top 10% of adults hold 85%, while the bottom 90% hold the remaining 15% of the world's total wealth,
 top 30% of adults hold 97% of the total wealth.

Wealth distribution pyramid in 2020 
In 2020, Credit Suisse created an updated wealth pyramid infographic. The infographic was constructed similarly to the pyramid in 2013, thus personal assets were calculated in net worth. In 2020, Credit Suisse estimated that approximately 2.88 billion people (55% of adult population) have wealth below US$10,000. Further, 1.7 billion individuals (38.2% of adult population) have wealth within the range of 10,000 – US$100,000. To continue, 583 million people have wealth within the range of 100,000 – US$1,000,000 and approximately 56 million people (1.1% of adult population) have wealth over US$1,000,000.

Comparison of 2013 and 2020 pyramids 
Vast differences between 2013 and 2020 infographic can be observed. For the first time, more than 1% of all global adults have wealth over US$1,000,000. Credit Suisse explains in the ‘Global Wealth Report 2021’, that this increase reflects the economic disruption caused by the pandemic and disconnect between the improvement in the financial and real assets of households. However, the biggest difference can be seen in the 10,000 – US$100,000 segment. Since 2013, there had been an increase of almost 10% of total adult population. According to Credit Suisse, the number of adults in this segment tripled since 2000. Credit Suisse explains this fact by stating that this increase was a result of growing prosperity of emerging economies, especially China, and the expansion of the middle class in the developing world. The upper-middle segment, with wealth in a range of 100,000 – US$1,000,000 has increased by 3.4%. Credit Suisse in the report states that the middle class in developed countries typically belong to this group.

Wealth outlook for 2020-2025 
According to the ‘Global wealth Report 2021’, published by Credit Suisse, global wealth is projected to rise by 39% over the next five years reaching USD 583 trillion by 2025. Wealth per adult is also projected to increase by 31% and so is the number of global millionaires. The wealth pyramid, an infographic used to determine wealth distribution, will also change. The bottom segment covering adults with a net worth below USD 10,000 will likely decrease by approximately 108 million over the next five years. The lower-middle segment of the pyramid containing adults with a net worth in the range of USD 10,000 and USD 100,000 is projected to rise by 237 million adults. Most of these new members are most likely to be from lower-income countries. The upper-middle segment, consisting of adults with wealth between USD 100,000 and USD 1 million is projected to rise by 178 million adults. Most of these new members (approximately 114 million) are likely to come from upper-middle-income countries. Number of global millionaires is also projected to increase. According to the estimates made by Credit Suisse, the number of global millionaires could exceed 84 million by 2025, a rise of almost 28 million from 2020. The increase of millionaires will not only occur in developed countries such as the USA or other developed countries in Europe, but it is also expected to rapidly increase in lower-income countries. The biggest increase is expected in China, with a change of 92.7%, which is about 4.8 million new dollar millionaires. As a consequence, the number of Ultra High Net Worth Individuals (UHNWI) with net worth exceeding USD 50 million, will also increase.

Gini Coefficient 
Gini coefficient is often used to determine wealth inequality. According to the Credit Suisse ‘Global wealth Report 2021’, Brunei had the highest Gini coefficient in 2021 (91.6%), therefore the wealth distribution in Brunei is vastly unequal. Slovakia had the lowest Gini coefficient in 2021 (50.3%) out of all countries, which makes Slovakia the most equal country in terms of wealth distribution. When compared to the report made by Credit Suisse in 2019, an increasing trend of wealth inequality can be observed. This may be the result of repercussions of the Covid-19 pandemic. The biggest increase was recorded in Brazil. The Gini coefficient in 2019 was 88.2% and 89% in 2021, with an increase of 0.8% over this period.

This table was created from information provided by the Credit Suisse Research Institute's "Global Wealth Databook", Table 3-1, published 2021.

Geographical distribution

Wealth is unevenly distributed across different world regions. At the end of the 20th century, wealth was concentrated among the G8 and Western industrialized nations, along with several Asian and OPEC nations. In the 21st century, wealth is still concentrated among the G8 with United States of America leading with 30.2%, along with other developed countries, several Asia-pacific countries and OPEC countries.

By region

World distribution of financial wealth.
In 2007, 147 companies controlled nearly 40 percent of the monetary value of all transnational corporations.

In the United States 

According to PolitiFact, in 2011 the 400 wealthiest Americans "have more wealth than half of all Americans combined." Inherited wealth may help explain why many Americans who have become rich may have had a "substantial head start". In September 2012, according to the Institute for Policy Studies, "over 60 percent" of the Forbes richest 400 Americans "grew up in substantial privilege".

In 2007, the richest 1% of the American population owned 34.6% of the country's total wealth (excluding human capital), and the next 19% owned 50.5%.  The top 20% of Americans owned 85% of the country's wealth and the bottom 80% of the population owned 15%.  From 1922 to 2010, the share of the top 1% varied from 19.7% to 44.2%, the big drop being associated with the drop in the stock market in the late 1970s. Ignoring the period where the stock market was depressed (1976–1980) and the period when the stock market was overvalued (1929), the share of wealth of the richest 1% remained extremely stable, at about a third of the total wealth. Financial inequality was greater than inequality in total wealth, with the top 1% of the population owning 42.7%, the next 19% of Americans owning 50.3%, and the bottom 80% owning 7%.  However, after the Great Recession which started in 2007, the share of total wealth owned by the top 1% of the population grew from 34.6% to 37.1%, and that owned by the top 20% of Americans grew from 85% to 87.7%.  The Great Recession also caused a drop of 36.1% in median household wealth but a drop of only 11.1% for the top 1%, further widening the gap between the 1% and the 99%.

Dan Ariely and Michael Norton show in a study (2011) that US citizens across the political spectrum significantly underestimate the current US wealth inequality and would prefer a more egalitarian distribution of wealth, raising questions about ideological disputes over issues like taxation and welfare.

Wealth concentration 
Wealth concentration is a process by which created wealth, under some conditions, can become concentrated by individuals or entities. Those who hold wealth have the means to invest in newly created sources and structures of wealth, or to otherwise leverage the accumulation of wealth, and are thus the beneficiaries of even greater wealth.

Economic conditions

The first necessary condition for the phenomenon of wealth concentration to occur is an unequal initial distribution of wealth. The distribution of wealth throughout the population is often closely approximated by a Pareto distribution, with tails which decay as a power-law in wealth. (See also: Distribution of wealth and Economic inequality). According to PolitiFact and others, the 400 wealthiest Americans had "more wealth than half of all Americans combined." Inherited wealth may help explain why many Americans who have become rich may have had a "substantial head start". In September 2012, according to the Institute for Policy Studies, "over 60 percent" of the Forbes richest 400 Americans "grew up in substantial privilege".

The second condition is that a small initial inequality must, over time, widen into a larger inequality. This is an example of positive feedback in an economic system. A team from Jagiellonian University produced statistical model economies showing that wealth condensation can occur whether or not total wealth is growing (if it is not, this implies that the poor could become poorer).

Joseph E. Fargione, Clarence Lehman and Stephen Polasky demonstrated in 2011 that chance alone, combined with the deterministic effects of compounding returns, can lead to unlimited concentration of wealth, such that the percentage of all wealth owned by a few entrepreneurs eventually approaches 100%.

Correlation between being rich and earning more
Given an initial condition in which wealth is unevenly distributed (i.e., a "wealth gap"), several non-exclusive economic mechanisms for wealth condensation have been proposed:
 A correlation between being rich and being given high-paid employment (oligarchy).
 A marginal propensity to consume low enough that high incomes are correlated with people who have already made themselves rich (meritocracy).
 The ability of the rich to influence government disproportionately to their favor thereby increasing their wealth (plutocracy).

In the first case, being wealthy gives one the opportunity to earn more through high paid employment (e.g., by going to elite schools). In the second case, having high paid employment gives one the opportunity to become rich (by saving your money). In the case of plutocracy, the wealthy exert power over the legislative process, which enables them to increase the wealth disparity. An example of this is the high cost of political campaigning in some countries, in particular in the US (more generally, see also plutocratic finance).

Because these mechanisms are non-exclusive, it is possible for all three explanations to work together for a compounding effect, increasing wealth concentration even further. Obstacles to restoring wage growth might have more to do with the broader dysfunction of a dollar dominated system particular to the US than with the role of the extremely wealthy.

Counterbalances to wealth concentration include certain forms of taxation, in particular wealth tax, inheritance tax and progressive taxation of income. However, concentrated wealth does not necessarily inhibit wage growth for ordinary workers with low wages.

Markets with social influence
Product recommendations and information about past purchases have been shown to influence consumers choices significantly whether it is for music, movie, book, technological, and other type of products. Social influence often induces a rich-get-richer phenomenon (Matthew effect) where popular products tend to become even more popular.

Redistribution of wealth and public policy

In many societies, attempts have been made, through property redistribution, taxation, or regulation, to redistribute wealth, sometimes in support of the upper class, and sometimes to diminish economic inequality.

Examples of this practice go back at least to the Roman republic in the third century B.C., when laws were passed limiting the amount of wealth or land that could be owned by any one family. Motivations for such limitations on wealth include the desire for equality of opportunity, a fear that great wealth leads to political corruption, to the belief that limiting wealth will gain the political favor of a voting bloc, or fear that extreme concentration of wealth results in rebellion. Various forms of socialism attempt to diminish the unequal distribution of wealth and thus the conflicts and social problems arising from it.

During the Age of Reason, Francis Bacon wrote "Above all things good policy is to be used so that the treasures and monies in a state be not gathered into a few hands…  Money is like fertilizer, not good except it be spread."

The rise of Communism as a political movement has partially been attributed to the distribution of wealth under capitalism in which a few lived in luxury while the masses lived in extreme poverty or deprivation.  However, in the Critique of the Gotha Program, Marx and Engels criticized German Social Democrats for placing emphasis on issues of distribution instead of on production and ownership of productive property. While the ideas of Marx have nominally influenced various states in the 20th century, the Marxist notions of socialism and communism remains elusive.

On the other hand, the combination of labor movements, technology, and social liberalism has diminished extreme poverty in the developed world today, though extremes of wealth and poverty continue in the Third World.

In the Outlook on the Global Agenda 2014 from the World Economic Forum the widening income disparities come second as a worldwide risk.

See also
 Wealth distribution in Europe
 Distributive justice
 Generational accounting
 Gini coefficient
 Economic inequality
 Kinetic exchange models of markets
 List of countries by financial assets per capita
 List of countries by total wealth
 List of countries by wealth per adult
 List of countries by wealth inequality

References

External links

 U.N. statistics – Distribution of Income and Consumption; wealth and poverty
 Research on the World Distribution of Household Wealth (UNU-WIDER) 
 CIA World Factbook: Field Listing – Distribution of family income – Gini index
 Annual income of richest 100 people enough to end global poverty four times over. Oxfam International, January 19, 2013.

Wealth surveys
Many countries have national wealth surveys, for example:
 The British Wealth and Assets Survey
 The Italian Survey on Household Income and Wealth
 The euro area Household Finance and Consumption Survey
 The US Survey of Consumer Finances
 The Canadian Survey of Financial Security
 The German Armuts- und Reichtumsbericht der Bundesregierung

Additional data, charts, and graphs
 Wealth, Income, and Power by G. William Domhoff
 PowerPoint presentation: Inequalities of Development – Lorenz curve and Gini coefficient
 Article on The World Distribution of Household Wealth report.
 The Federal Reserve Board – Survey of Consumer Finances
 Survey of Consumer Finances 1998–2004 charts – pdf
 Survey of Consumer Finances 1998–2004 dataand resulting Gini indices for mean incomes: 1989: 51.1, 1992: 47.8, 1995: 49.0, 1998: 50.4, 2001: 52.6, 2004: 51.4
 Changes in the Distribution of Wealth in the U.S., 1989–2001
 Report on Net Worth and Asset Ownership of Households
 Projections of the Number of Households in the U.S. 1995–2010
 The System of National Accounts (SNA): comparison of U.S. national accounts statistics with those of other countries
 World Trade Organization: Resources
 Champagne Glass infographic of global wealth distribution from Dalton Conley's You May Ask Yourself: An Introduction to Thinking Like a Sociologist textbook which was adapted from the 1992 UNDP original